Enneapterygius hsiojenae is a species of triplefin blenny in the genus Enneapterygius. It was described by Shih-Chieh Shen in 1994. and was named in honour of Shen's wife  Hsiojen Lin Shen. It is found around Taiwan and off the coast of Vietnam.

References

hsiojenae
Taxa named by Shen Shih-Chieh
Fish described in 1994